The Time of Our Lives is an Australian television drama. It was created by Amanda Higgs and Judi McCrossin, the co-creator  and principal writer of The Secret Life of Us. It premiered on ABC on 16 June 2013. The show focuses on the Tivolli family –  Luce (Shane Jacobson), Matt (William McInnes) and Chai Li (Michelle Vergara Moore) and their partners Bernadette (Justine Clarke), Caroline (Claudia Karvan) and Herb (Stephen Curry). The Time of Our Lives was renewed for a second season on 19 October 2013. The second and final season premiered on 26 June 2014. On 5 September 2014, it was announced that the ABC had cancelled The Time of Our Lives.

Series overview

Episodes

Season 1 (2013)

Season 2 (2014) 
The Time of Our Lives was renewed on 19 October 2013 for a second season of eight episodes. It aired between 26 June and 14 August 2014.

References

Lists of Australian drama television series episodes